, or HUS, is a private university in Sapporo, Hokkaidō, Japan, established in 1967. The predecessor of the school was founded in 1924.

Athletics

HUS's intercollegiate sports teams are called the "Wolves".

External links
 
  

Educational institutions established in 1924
Private universities and colleges in Japan
Universities and colleges in Sapporo
Engineering universities and colleges in Japan
1924 establishments in Japan
Hokkaido American Football Association